The 1986 Nebraska gubernatorial election was held on November 4, 1986, and featured state Treasurer Kay Orr, a Republican, defeating Democratic nominee, former Mayor of Lincoln Helen Boosalis. Incumbent Democratic governor Bob Kerrey did not seek a second term.

The election was the first state gubernatorial election in U.S. history where the candidates of both major national parties were women.

Democratic primary

Candidates
Chris Beutler, member of the Nebraska Legislature
Helen Boosalis, former mayor of Lincoln and Director of the Nebraska Department of Aging 
Barton E. Chandler
Mina B. Dillingham
David Domina, attorney
Marge Higgins
Robert J. Prokop

Results

Republican primary

Candidates
Kermit Brashear, attorney and former Chairman of the Nebraska Republican Party
Nancy Hoch, businesswoman and Republican nominee for U.S. Senate in 1984
Chuck Loos
Kay A. Orr, state Treasurer
Paul A. Rosberg
Everett Sileven
Monte Taylor
Roger Yant

Results

General election

Results

References

Gubernatorial
1986
Nebraska